Mappillai may refer to:

 Maappillai (1952 film), an Indian Tamil-language drama directed by T. R. Raghunath
 Mappillai (1989 film), an Indian Tamil-language action comedy directed by Rajasekhar
 Mappillai (2011 film), an Indian Tamil-language action comedy directed by Suraj
 Mappillai (Vijay TV serial), a 2016 Indian Tamil-language soap opera
 Coimbatore Mappillai, an Indian Tamil-language romantic comedy directed by C. Ranganathan